Rayment is an English surname of Old Norman origin. It derives from the given name Raymond. Notable people with the surname include:

 Alan Rayment (born 1928), English cricketer
 Doug Rayment (1910–1978), Australian rules footballer
 Kenneth Rayment (1921–1958), British pilot
 Ricky Rayment, British television personality
 Tarlton Rayment (1882-1964), Australian artist, author, broadcaster, poet, naturalist, entomologist and beekeeper

References

English-language surnames